Afromurzinia fletcheri is a moth in the family Erebidae. It was described by Sergius G. Kiriakoff in 1958. It is found in Tanzania.

References

Moths described in 1958
Spilosomina
Moths of Africa